The Musketeer is a 2001 American action-adventure film based on Alexandre Dumas's classic 1844 novel The Three Musketeers, directed and photographed by Peter Hyams and starring Catherine Deneuve, Mena Suvari, Stephen Rea, Tim Roth and Justin Chambers.

The film features Tsui Hark's regular actor Xin-Xin Xiong as a stunt choreographer. Released days before the September 11 attacks, it was a box office success in North America but didn't perform well in other countries, and received largely negative reviews from critics. It is recognized by the department of Gers as the first Musketeers adaptation to incorporate authentic scenery from Charles de Batz's home region.

Plot
The young boy D'Artagnan witnesses the murder of his parents at the hands of Febre, chief henchman of Cardinal Richelieu, d'Artagnan is nearly killed after using his dead father's sword to fight Febre, who is then left with a permanent scar and blind in one eye. D'Artagnan is taken in by Planchet, a family friend and former musketeer, one of the loyal protectors of king Louis XIII.

Fourteen years later, the adult d'Artagnan finds on his arrival in Paris that the musketeers have been disbanded by order of Cardinal Richelieu, who is usurping the king's authority with the help of Febre. Richelieu is also trying to foment hostility between France, England and Spain to gain more political power for himself. D'Artagnan convinces two of the musketeers, Porthos and Aramis, to free the imprisoned head of the musketeers, Treville, thus earning their trust. He takes a room at a Paris boarding house, where he takes a fancy to the chambermaid, Francesca, who is the daughter of the late seamstress to the queen. Febre, on orders from Richelieu, incites a mob to attack the French Royal Palace during a State dinner for Lord Buckingham, a visiting English dignitary. D'Artagnan, with the help of Porthos, Aramis and another musketeer, Athos, saves King Louis, the queen, and Lord Buckingham from being hurt or killed. Afterwards, Francesca recruits d'Artagnan to make a clandestine trip to the north coast of France with the queen to meet with Buckingham in whose honor the state dinner was being held, to keep peace between the two countries. However, d'Artagnan's landlord overhears them and tells Febre.

During the trip, d'Artagnan fights off repeated attacks by Febre's henchmen. He and Francesca become intimate, only to have Febre discover them and kidnap her and the queen. Febre forces the queen to write a letter to Buckingham asking him to meet her at a heavily fortified castle of his choosing, using the queen's ring to convince him of the authenticity of the message. Richelieu finally realizes just how far Febre is willing to go: he means to start a war between France, England and Spain, a war that will cripple France. Knowing that he has lost control of his chief henchman, Richelieu secretly visits d'Artagnan and tells him of Febre's plans and pleads for his help to stop Febre. D'Artagnan agrees, but only because Febre is holding Francesca. D'Artagnan returns to Paris and convinces the surviving musketeers that their responsibility to the crown remains their highest priority, and they join him at the castle where Francesca, the queen, and Lord Buckingham are being held. They charge the castle on horseback, losing several of their number in the process, but the diversion they create allows Planchet to drive his carriage in front of the castle gates below the field of cannon fire from the castle. This enables him to fire a mortar directly into the castle gates.

The remaining musketeers battle the Cardinal's guards, while d'Artagnan engages Febre in an intense duel, finally killing him and avenging the death of his parents. D'Artagnan and the Three Musketeers are given medals for their service, and d'Artagnan covertly threatens Richelieu. At the end, d'Artagnan and Francesca are seen to be married.

Cast

Differences from the novel and other adaptations
The film is a broad reimagining of Dumas' work, which deemphasizes political machinations in favor of a revenge plot typical of modern action films. A new antagonist, Febre, who has psychopathic traits, takes precedence over the book's historical figures. Febre's portrayal as a one-eyed man in black bears strong similarities to that of Rochefort in the Walt Disney adaptation. The character's eyepatch actually dates all the way back to the 1973 film. In the book, he only has a scar. Also similar to the 1993 film, D'Artagnan's father was a former musketeer and was murdered—this time alongside his wife—by the man in black. In this version however, the parents' murder is a gratuitous crime to which a young D'Artagnan bears witness. It is not part of Richelieu's conspiracy and neither Athos, Porthos nor Aramis, who have greatly reduced roles throughout, are aware of it. In the novel, D'Artagnan leaves his father in good health. The senior D'Artagnan was never a musketeer, but his son is encouraged to enlist due the family's noble Gascon background, which it shares with many members of the guard.

The character of Planchet is not a mere servant D'Artagnan hires in Paris, but a sidekick and mentor to the D'Artagnan family, who raises the boy after his parents' death and arms himself with concealed pistols.
Whereas D'Artagnan romances several women at once in the novel, the film's version is inexperienced with the ladies. Constance Bonacieux, his older love interest, is replaced with Francesca Bonacieux, a younger and more upbeat figure. She is the daughter of a Spanish seamstress who followed Infanta Anne to France when she married Louis XIII. Rather than being married to D'Artagnan's landlord, she is his niece, although the older man tries to extort sexual favors from her.

Early in the film the Musketeers are framed for the murder of a Spanish envoy and disbanded, which too is broadly similar to the 1993 version. In the book, the Musketeers have frequent skirmishes with Richelieu's guards, but they are still in activity. The novel's court intrigues have been simplified. While the Queen has a volatile relationship with Louis XIII, Lord Buckingham is not her lover and the diamond studs subplot is absent, as is Richelieu's spy Milady De Winter. The Cardinal's scheme is more straightforward and entails the staging of public incidents that will sap the King's credibility. Rochefort is an elegant character who seems to obey Richelieu out of deference for his political stature, rather than outright malevolence. Perhaps due to the invention of Febre, Rochefort's rivalry with D'Artagnan in The Musketeer remains gentlemanly. It is somewhat truer to the book than his outright villainous portrayal in many other adaptations, even though he meets a different end. Both Richelieu and Rochefort are blindsided by Febre's ruthlessness and by his direct attack on the Queen.

Production

Development
Gene Quintano sold the film's script to Moshe Diamant, a producer at Mark Damon's Vision International, for $750,000 in 1992. Quintano aspired to direct the project, then titled D'Artagnan, himself. It was one of several Three Musketeers adaptations in the works at the time: others were being pitched at Columbia (by Damon's former Vision associate Jon Peters), Disney and Tri-Star. Eventually, the attention received by Disney's film put a damper on rival projects. Quintano's version was put on hold, and would later be revived at Vision's successor company, MDP (Mark Damon Productions) Worldwide.

The project resurfaced in 2000 with Hyams (who had helmed two Jean-Claude Van Damme vehicles for Diamant) as director, and Mena Suvari and Gary Oldman (who had been approached for the 1993 version) attached to star. Michael Lonsdale was also in talks to appear. Ultimately the latter two did not participate. Catherine Deneuve was in negociations to star for several months, but only signed on shortly before filming.

The swashbuckling tale's wire fu makeover was Diamant's idea, as he had previously worked with Xin-Xin Xiong on Tsui Hark's Double Team and Knock Off, two films starring his usual leading man Van Damme. Xiong would work for Diamant on a few more Western films after The Musketeer.

The film was originally announced under the banner of Behaviour Communications, the film branch of a Canadian multimedia conglomerate, into which producer American Mark Damon had merged his company MDP Worldwide in 1998. But after another restructuring, the company changed its name back to MDP Worldwide in May 2000. The film was an international co-production between the United States, the United Kingdom, Germany and Luxembourg. It was part of a trio of films co-produced by MDP/Behaviour, Luxembourg's Carousel Picture Company and German tax shelter fund AppolloMedia. The others were FeardotCom and Extreme Ops (the latter of which Quintano helped write).

While based on a French work, the film did not receive any subsidies from France's national film support fund, as it was viewed as a commercially-oriented production. It did, however, receive some from the regional governments whose territories were showcased in the picture.
Despite interest from the local population, casting agents struggled to find suitable extras to portray post-medieval peasantry, as they found out that most modern inhabitants of rural Southern France lacked the rough facial features desired by the production, and looked too urban.

The film was only shown at March 2001's American Film Market in the form of a sizzle reel. It was successful with foreign buyers, but faced a tentative domestic market towards large independent productions. Hyams finished assembling his first print in mid-April 2001. The same month, MDP entered final negociations with Universal and Miramax, who teamed up to buy the film's North American and U.K. rights for $7.5 million. Universal would release it in North America, and Miramax in the United Kingdom. Around the same time, the film's English-language version was renamed The Musketeer. It retained its intended title in select foreign territories, such as France.

Filming
Shooting commenced on 17 August 2000, and took place in Luxembourg, Belgium and France. In addition to choreographing the fight scenes, Xin-Xin Xiong was Tim Roth's stunt double.

The streets of 17th century Paris were recreated in Sarlat-la-Canéda. The Dordogne town claims to be the 3rd most requested filming location in France after Paris and Nice, as its well preserved architecture makes it highly sought after for historical films. Another Dordogne locality, Monpazier, stood in for downtown Brionne.
Sarlat and a castle on the outskirts of Monpazier figure in another revisionist take on Dumas, Revenge of the Musketeers.

The Cité de Carcassonne provided some wide shots of the French capital's now demolished fortifications. Some specific Paris locations were based on buildings in Toulouse: the Royal Palace is the redecorated Capitole, while Richelieu's residence is the Convent of the Jacobins. The Toulouse part of the shoot was briefly disturbed by a dispute between local extras and Auzielle-based Capitole Productions, who had hired them on behalf of the film's main producers. At least one scene was cancelled as a result.

The production also incorporated locations from Gascony, the actual region where D'Artagnan grew up, although they do not necessarily represent their real-life counterparts in narration. Among the more notable are Château de Cassaigne, which is used as the domain where the Queen seeks shelter after escaping from Paris, and Château de Caumont in Cazaux-Savès, which stands in for the Musketeers' headquarters at Monsieur de Tréville's.

Vianden Castle in Luxembourg became the fictional Duchamps Castle, where the film's climactic action scene takes place. Vianden's mayor was apparently displeased with damage the castle suffered during filming.

Release

Theatrical
The Musketeer held its world premiere in Los Angeles on 5 November 2001. The film was selected for the 27th Deauville Festival, where it held its European premiere out of competition on 7 November 2001. The launch trailer started with a condensed preview of the film's tavern fight, exempt of any dialogue or voice-over, and later proclaimed "This fall, Alexandre Dumas' classic is completely reimagined with fight choreography by Hong Kong legend Xin-Xin Xiong." None of the director and stars' names were mentioned. Industry professionals saw the promotional focus on martial arts and the trailer's extensive rotation ahead of Universal's teen comedy American Pie 2 as the main factors behind the film's relatively successful launch. IGN felt that Universal's hyping of Xiong as a "legend" was exaggerated, as his style owed much to some of his forebears like Yuen Woo-ping.

Home media
The film was released on DVD on 26 February 2002. It reached number 4 in [[Billboard Charts|Billboard'''s national DVD sales chart]]. In Germany, distributor MC One issued a limited and numbered 2-DVD Digipak special edition with a hologram cover and 24-page booklet.

Reception
Commercial
Upon release, trade publication Variety projected that the film would perform respectably in U.S. theaters, but would find more favor in international markets. The Los Angeles Times thought otherwise, suggesting that the film's independent producers would find it hard to break even internationally after selling the U.S. rights for a modest amount.

The film debuted with a $10.7 million opening ahead of Two Can Play That Game; it was the number-one film in the country in the weekend before the 9/11 terror attacks. In its second weekend the film made $5.3 million. The decrease was not necessarily due to the terror attacks, as overall box office intake was actually higher year-on-year. The Musketeer went on grossing $27 million in Canada and the United States.

Internationally, The Musketeer struggled, sometimes for reasons beyond the film itself. In France, the country of top billed Catherine Deneuve, it opened on a modest 341 screens for a career tally of 228,037 admissions. In Germany, which contributed much of the film's budget, theatrical release was compromised by a falling out between distribution partners Helkon and Buena Vista, and eventually cancelled in favor of a home video premiere nearly two years after its U.S. debut. The film is credited with a non-domestic gross of just $7 million for a combined worldwide gross of $34 million, against its $36 million production budget.

Nonetheless, sales of the film's rights, combined with efficient tax optimization, made The Musketeer a positive venture according to MDP, contributing $27 million to the company's revenue and helping it back in the black after several difficult years. Universal also called the film "a very successful acquisition".

Critical
On Rotten Tomatoes, the film has an approval rating of 11% based on 96 reviews, with an average rating of 3.5/10. The website's consensus states that "Hong Kong inspired action sequences take center stage in this latest Three Musketeers adaptation. Unfortunately, the oversimplification of the story and an uncharismatic lead character leave the movie flat."The Musketeer received similar criticism to the 1993 version, to which its is most often compared, with many feeling that the integrity of the source material had been compromised in an effort to cater to a younger, casual audience. The Chicago Tribune 's Michael Wilmington called it "even worse" than that film, and made for people "who think that D'Artagnan is a men's cologne". Stephen Holden of The New York Times argued that "The Musketeer conflicts with itself by trying to blend grand old-school costume drama and MTV-style rhythm and attitude in the same movie."Boxoffice Magazine did not object to the story's reimagining, judging it "less disgraceful" than Disney's film and 1998's The Man in the Iron Mask, but contended that Hyams and editor Terry Rawlings were out of touch with the requirements of Hong Kong choreography in terms of coverage and clarity. Some scenes, like the ladder fight, were also criticized for their similarities to Xiong's past work. While Roger Ebert said that he "can not in strict accuracy recommend this film", he conceded that "the action scenes are wonders to behold". The Los Angeles Times Kevin Thomas, an exponent of popular action cinema, called the film "robust and handsome".

The Musketeer'''s art direction was praised, with Boxoffice touting "lavish production values" and Ebert calling the banquet scene "a marvel of art design". The film also earned notice for its photography relying primarily on natural light, which Thomas and the Houston Chronicle 's Louis B. Parks compared to a painting. However, like many of Hyams' previous works, some found it too dark.

Quintano's mix of modern and classic phrasing was criticized as an "awkward melange" by Boxoffice, while IGN said that it "can't make up its mind at to be either somewhat Shakespearean sounding or emulating modern vernacular." The teen romance between D'Artagnan and Francesca was equally poorly received: The Washington Posts Michael O'Sullivan equated it to "a child's idea of romantic love".

Justin Chambers' interpretation of D'Artagnan elicited particular disdain, with several reviewers comparing it to soap opera acting. Many found Catherine Deneuve wasted as Queen Anne, with Hollywood.com calling her "completey underused". Despite some pushback over his character's unnecessary inclusion, a number of reviewers singled out Tim Roth's unhinged performance as Febre as the most enjoyable aspect of the film. Ebert added that "when Tim Roth vows vengeance on the man who blinded him, I for one believe him." The more modern characterization of Planchet and his portrayal by Jean-Pierre Castaldi also received praise, with the Chicago Tribune calling him "a ton of fun".

A few critics have defended the film's action focus, arguing that it could be seen as an evolution of the acrobatics seen in Douglas Fairbanks' 1921 and 1929 films. In a retrospective review, genre film website The Action Elite deemed that the film was "not that memorable" but "arguably [had] the best action scenes of any incarnation of these characters, making it a fun ride."

The Musketeer has drawn some—mostly unfavorable—comparisons to Brotherhood of the Wolf, a contemporary Universal release that mixed romanticized European history and Asian martial arts. Both films were shot in close locations, with some actors, local extras and crew members taking part in both films.

Soundtrack
The film's score was composed and produced by David Arnold, and conducted and arranged by frequent collaborator Nicholas Dodd. It was released on CD by the Decca Records, a Universal Music subsidiary, on 11 September 2001. The soundtrack has been a fixture of Universal Studios Florida and could frequently heard in the park's entrance.

References

External links

2001 films
2000s action adventure films
Films scored by David Arnold
Films based on The Three Musketeers
Films directed by Peter Hyams
American swashbuckler films
Films set in the 1620s
Films set in France
Films set in Paris
Universal Pictures films
Impact of the September 11 attacks on cinema
Cultural depictions of Cardinal Richelieu
Cultural depictions of Louis XIII
Films with screenplays by Gene Quintano
2000s English-language films
2000s American films